Yelyzaveta Zorkina (Belarusian: Елізавета Зоркіна; born 25 January 2006) is a Belarusian individual rhythmic gymnast of Ukrainian descent.

Career

Junior 
Zorkina started to appear internationally in 2018, participating in various tournaments and winning medals. In November 2020 she was part of the team that represented Belarus at the European Championships in Kyiv, that were postponed because of the Covid-19 pandemic, competing with ball and clubs. She made it to both apparatus finals, winning bronze with ball behind  Polina Karika and Stiliana Nikolova, and silver with clubs behind Daria Atamanov and ahead Evelin Viktória Kocsis.

In 2021 Yelyzaveta took part in the 2021 Moscow Grand Prix, in May in the Irina Deleanu Cup where she won bronze with ribbon.

Senior 
In 2022 she turned senior but following the Russian invasion of Ukraine in February gymnasts from Belarus were also forbidden to participate in FIG events. Zorkina, like many other Russian and Belarusian gymnasts then started attending bilateral tournaments between the two nations, or open competitions such as Crystal Rose (where she was 7th in the All-Around) or the UAE International Gymnastika Cup.

References 

2006 births
Living people
Belarusian rhythmic gymnasts
Medalists at the Rhythmic Gymnastics European Championships
21st-century Belarusian women